Magical Ring is the seventh album by Irish folk group Clannad. Released in 1983, the album features the band's biggest hit single, "Theme from Harry's Game", which reached #5 on the UK Singles Chart and #2 on the Irish Singles Chart.

Track listing
 "Theme from Harry's Game" (Pól Brennan, Ciarán Brennan) – 2:30
 "Tower Hill" (P. Brennan) – 3:51
 "Seachrán Charn tSiail" (Traditional) – 2:20
 "Passing Time" (P. Brennan, C. Brennan) – 3:44
 "Coinleach Ghlas an Fhómhair" (Traditional) – 5:57
 "I See Red" (Jim Rafferty) – 4:23
 "Tá 'mé Mo Shuí" (Traditional) – 3:13
 "Newgrange" (C. Brennan) – 4:03
 "The Fairy Queen" (Traditional) – 2:40
 "Thíos Fá'n Chósta" (P. Brennan, C. Brennan, Pádraig Duggan) – 3:16
 "Coinleach Glas an Fhómhair - Cantoma Mix" (bonus track available only on 2003 Deluxe Edition) - 6:22

Charts

Singles
 "Theme from Harry's Game"
 "I See Red"
 "Newgrange"

Personnel

Band
 Ciarán Ó Braonáin – bass, guitar, keyboards, vocals
 Máire Ní Bhraonáin – vocals, harp
 Pól Ó Braonáin – flute, guitar, percussion, vocals
 Noel Ó Dúgáin – guitar, vocals
 Pádraig Ó Dúgáin – guitar, vocals

Additional Musicians
 Ed Deane – electric guitar
 James Delaney – synthesizers, keyboards
 Alan Dunn – accordion
 Charlie Morgan – drums
 Pádraig O'Donnell – vocals
 Frank Ricotti – percussion

Production
 Richard Dodd – engineer, producer
 Austin Ince – engineer
 Gered Mankowitz – photography
 Rob O'Connor – design

References

1983 albums
Clannad albums
RCA Records albums